The Motorola V3688 (also known as Wings) is a GSM cellular phone, released by Motorola in 1999. It was the lightest and smallest phone of its time, and based on the clamshell design. It was superseded by the similar V3690 and V50.

Specifications
The complete Motorola V3688 list of specifications are:

References

External links
V3688 Service Manual

V3688